Naser Al Bahar;born October 17, 1973, in Baghdad, Iraq, is an Iraqi singer, composer and songwriter.

Discography

Singles
2009: "Tela3t Mneen"
2010: "Shasaweelah"
2012: "Atob Lelbeet"
2013: "La Thelfen Yalhabbabah"
2013: "Bali Beek Mashghool" (Feat. Hakim)
2013: "La Teroh"
2014: "Yel3an Abu Alayam" (Featuring Ali Saber)
2016: "Of Mennak"
2017: "Ma Rad Ele"
2017: "Elghammazah"
2017: "3eshrat 3omor"

See also
List of best-selling music artists

References

Living people
1973 births
21st-century Iraqi male singers
Iraqi male singer-songwriters